Chirgus is a genus of checkered-skippers, white-skippers, and allies in the butterfly family Hesperiidae, found in the New World. The genus was erected by Nick V. Grishin in 2019. There are about six described species in Chirgus.

As a result of a 2019 study of the genomes of 250 representative species of skippers, the genera Chirgus was created to contain six related species formerly in the genus Pyrgus.

Species
These six species belong to the genus Chirgus:
 Chirgus barrosi (Ureta, 1956)
 Chirgus bocchoris (Hewitson, 1874)
 Chirgus fides (Hayward, 1940)
 Chirgus limbata (Erschoff, 1876)
 Chirgus nigella (Weeks, 1902)
 Chirgus veturius (Plötz, 1884)

References

Further reading

 
 
 
 

Pyrgini